WBIX (1260 AM) – branded Nossa Rádio USA – is a commercial Brazilian Portuguese radio station licensed to Boston, Massachusetts, serving Greater Boston. Owned by the International Church of the Grace of God, the WBIX studios are located in the Boston suburb of Somerville, while the station transmitter resides in Quincy, on the southern banks of the Neponset River near the Southeast Expressway. Besides its main analog transmission, WBIX is available online.

History

WNAC (1260 AM) 
The station gave its first broadcast on July 31, 1922, as WNAC, founded by Boston businessman John Shepard III. His father, John Shepard Jr., had a chain of department stores throughout New England and saw the potential of radio to publicize himself and his stores enough to finance his son's venture; Shepard had also established WEAN in Providence, Rhode Island, a month earlier, on June 2, 1922. The station was initially promoted after signing on as the "Shepard Radio Station"; it was not until September that the call letters "WNAC" came into use.

WNAC moved around the dial in its early days and settled on 1230 kilocycles a few years later. On January 4, 1923, using a 100-foot antenna connected by a clothesline to the building's roof, WNAC arranged the first network broadcast in radio history with station WEAF in New York City.

Shepard launched a sister station to WNAC, WNAB, on May 13, 1925. WNAB became WASN (Air Shopping News) on February 1, 1927, an early experiment with home shopping by radio, in which updates from 15 department stores in Greater Boston aired in regular intervals alongside pre-recorded and live orchestra music. WASN was also notable in that all of the staff announcers and the program director were females; while the experiment was short-lived due to technical issues, the majority of the station's female staff enjoyed continued employment at WNAC. By July 5, the station became WBIS (Boston Information Service), maintaining some of the shopping programming but mixed with "helpful information and advice" in addition to pre-recorded music; the station operated with limited hours, from 8-10 a.m. and 2-4 p.m. on weekdays. WBIS merged operations fully into WNAC in April 1928, and the station was known in FCC records as "WNAC-WBIS" until 1933.

In 1927, WNAC became one of the sixteen charter members of the CBS Radio Network, it remained a CBS network affiliate for the next decade. In 1929, WNAC moved to new studios inside the Hotel Buckminster, with the entrance on the Brookline Avenue side (21 Brookline Avenue), that location served as the station's home for the next four decades.

Between February 1929 and July 1930, Shepard also launched The Yankee Network, with WNAC as its flagship; it was a regional network serving radio stations throughout New England and was a pioneer in radio news coverage. For many years, the Yankee Network was considered one of the best local/regional radio news operations in the country, WNAC and successor station WNAC (680 AM) would serve as the network flagship until its closure in 1967.

In 1931, Shepard purchased a second Boston station, WAAB, which became an affiliate of the Mutual Radio Network in 1935, a year after MBS was formed. He also launched a second regional network, "The Colonial Network", with WAAB as its flagship station. Outside of Boston, Yankee and Colonial programming were usually heard on the same station. Additionally, Colonial carried Mutual programming to its affiliates. Between them, Yankee and Colonial carried home games of the Boston Red Sox and Boston Braves baseball teams as well as the Boston Bruins hockey team.

The year 1935 also saw the hiring of Fred B. Cole, a young announcer who would spend more than 50 years on the air, most of them in Boston at various stations. Cole left WNAC for network radio, and returned to Boston at WHDH (850 AM) in 1946.

In 1937, WNAC became an NBC Red Network affiliate after losing CBS to WEEI (590 AM). Four years later, WNAC's frequency changed to 1260 kilocycles. In 1942, to comply with anti-duopoly regulations established by the Federal Communications Commission, WAAB was moved to Worcester, about 40 miles west of Boston. At the same time, WNAC lost NBC Red Network affiliation to WBZ. With WAAB having been moved out of Boston, WNAC took over the Mutual affiliation. The Colonial Network was also shut down, with Yankee picking up many of its programs; in other parts of New England, however, the only change for some former Colonial programming was in the time periods of these shows.

In December 1942, the Winter Street Corp., the holding company for Shepard family interests—including WNAC and the Yankee Network—announced it would be sold to The General Tire & Rubber Company for $1.24 million. Winter Street was controlled by trusts set up for two of the children of founder John Shepard Jr.: John Shepard III (general manager of WNAC and Yankee); and Robert Shepard, who managed the family's remaining department store in Providence; the transactions, and the closing of the Shepard Stores location in Boston in 1937, were viewed as a strategy to convert the elder Shepard's assets to cash. John Shepard III remained with the station as general manager under a five-year contract. The son of General Tire president William F. O'Neil, William M. O'Neil, Jr., had already owned and operated WJW (850 AM) in Akron/Cleveland since 1940, but did so independently of his father and the manufacturer.

Later that same month, the FCC approved the transaction after securing an affidavit from General Tire's president that "no better deal" would be offered the tire company to buy "time, facilities and services" on Yankee Network stations, and that General Tire would "never" use its ownership to gain an unfair advertising advantage over competitors. Some 40 years later, the company was forced to exit broadcasting for reasons including illegal reciprocal trade agreements. In addition to WNAC and the two networks, the sale included WEAN, WAAB, WICC in Bridgeport, Connecticut; and experimental FM stations in Paxton, Massachusetts, and Mount Washington, New Hampshire.

In 1947, the FCC denied a request to allow WNAC to move to 1200 kHz and boost its power, using a directional 50,000-watt transmitter.

WVDA 
In May 1953, General Teleradio – then the name for General Tire's broadcasting division – sold WNAC to Vic Diehm and Associates, Inc., for $125,000. At the same time, it bought WLAW (AM 680) and WLAW-FM (FM 93.7), both licensed to Lawrence, Massachusetts, from Hildreth and Rogers for $475,000. General Teleradio then surrendered the 93.7 license, as it retained its existing FM property, WNAC-FM (98.5). On June 17, 1953, General Teleradio changed WLAW's call letters to WNAC and moved 1260 AM's old format there. On- and off-air personnel were reassigned at the same time. In effect, the new WNAC (680 AM) licensed to Lawrence became the successor to the old WNAC (1260 AM) licensed to Boston. For this reason, this transaction is often reckoned as a "move" of WNAC from 1260 to 680. Vic Diehm and Associates subsequently changed 1260 AM's calls to WVDA and launched a new format on the station, using WLAW's former studios in the Hotel Bradford in Boston.

Most of WVDA's programming was from the ABC Radio Network, with some local programming. Among them were a few DJ shows, and for a brief time in the mid-1950s, a 3-hour morning news block.

WEZE 
The station was sold in 1957 to Great Trails Broadcasting Corp., owned by former Truman administration Commerce Secretary Charles Sawyer, for $252,000. It became WEZE, an NBC Radio Network affiliate. The station carried most NBC Radio programs, and some local DJ shows featuring softer music.

On October 19, 1959, WEZE began a beautiful music format, branded as "The Wonderful World Of Music", that targeted older listeners. The station programmed music in uninterrupted quarter-hour blocks during the daytime hours (half-hour blocks at night), and continued to serve as Boston's NBC Radio affiliate until 1966. It carried hourly newscasts, some feature programs, special news events, but very little of the network's Monitor weekend service. During the "Wonderful World Of Music" days, live announcers spoke only every fifteen minutes, to run down what had been played during the previous quarter-hour, read commercials, and give weather updates.

In his autobiography, comedian George Carlin describes his experiences as a disc jockey at the station. He was fired after he took the station's news station wagon to New York to buy marijuana, leaving the station unable to cover a prison riot.  Carlin wrote that another future comedian, Jack Burns, also worked there as an announcer and newscaster at the station during this time.  Although only 5,000 watts, WEZE was one of Boston's top-rated radio stations for most of the 1960s. Then, the beautiful music format made a big splash on FM, diverting listeners from WEZE's AM signal.

For many years, WEZE's studios were located on the ground floor of the Statler Office Building near Boston's Park Square, with a picture window on the corner of St. James and Columbus Avenues, allowing passers-by to see the announcer at work in the studio.

In the fall of 1972, WEZE changed formats to a rock 'n roll oldies sound with live personality DJs. This was tweaked by mid-1973 by program director Steve Hunter and consultant Kent Burkhardt to include current pop/rock hits as well. Known as "Z 1260", WEZE was then in direct competition with established top 40 AM stations WRKO (680 AM), WMEX (1510 AM), and WVBF (105.7 FM, now WROR-FM). Perhaps the best-known announcer during this period was Alan Colmes, who replaced Chuck Kelly in the morning drive slot and who later co-hosted a talk show with Sean Hannity on cable TV's Fox News Channel. In March 1974, WEZE's format was modified again to a more MOR/personality approach.

From August 1975 until early 1977, WEZE tried "The Wonderful World Of Music" again (which was often branded "The Easiest Sound In Town" in newspaper ads, billboards, and television commercials). Since FM radios still weren't widespread in automobiles, station management hoped that people who would listen to easy-listening FM stations like WJIB (96.9 FM, now WBQT) at home or work would listen to WEZE on their AM-only car radios while driving. The revival met with very little success, as the audience for "beautiful music" had largely moved to FM.

In early 1977, WEZE became one of the first stations to program what might now be called adult album alternative. This format, promoted as "AlbuM 1260" (stylized to denote its frequency as "AM 1260"), continued until the 1978 sale of the station to New England Continental Media.

New England Continental Media, which shortly became the Salem Media Group, instituted a religious format. Initially, WEZE's religious programming consisted of contemporary Christian music, Christian features, teaching, and preaching; half of the station's schedule was devoted to music. While a religious station, the station continued to operate commercially. By the mid 1980s, local Christian talk shows replaced some of the hours of weekday music programming. In later years, more teaching programs were added to replace the remaining weekday music hours; after 1984, WEZE only played inspirational music on weekends for a few hours.

Later years 
Salem exercised an option to acquire WBNW (590 AM) in the fall of 1996, and that December, began a simulcast that resulted in WEZE's call letters and programming moving to 590 kHz. Following a simulcast on both frequencies, 1260 become WPZE "Praise 1260" in February 1997. The Praise 1260 format included programs that Salem lacked the time to air on WEZE, along with about 6 hours a day of rhythmic Christian music. This consisted of upbeat praise and worship church music, gospel, and soft AC Christian cuts. However, in July, Salem sold the station to Hibernia Broadcasting, which switched it to Radio Disney on November 21.  (The Praise 1260 format was dropped earlier in that fall in preparation for the sale, and in the interim, WPZE returned to simulcasting WEZE).  The station changed its call letters to WMKI late in December 1999 and was sold in a group deal to ABC, Inc., the owner of Radio Disney, in 2000.

On August 13, 2014, Disney put WMKI and 22 other Radio Disney stations up for sale, to focus more on digital distribution of the Radio Disney network. On June 5, 2015, Disney filed to sell WMKI back to Salem Media Group. Salem bought the station for $500,000. Upon retaking control, Salem changed WMKI to WBIX, call letters that had previously been used on 1060 AM (now WQOM) from 2001 to 2010. The FCC approved the sale on August 4, 2015. As a result, the station discontinued its affiliation with Radio Disney. It went silent from August 12 to 15. The sale was completed on September 10, and the station went silent again until September 14. WBIX then changed to a conservative talk format, a format Salem had programmed in the market on WTTT (1150 AM, now WWDJ) from 2003 to 2008.

WBIX was branded as "The Buzz", although many of Salem's other conservative talk stations are branded as "The Answer". It carried syndicated talk shows from the Salem Radio Network, including Hugh Hewitt, Mike Gallagher, Michael Medved, Larry Elder, Eric Metaxas, and Dennis Prager, and business programs, including Ray Lucia from the Business Talk Radio Network.  Weekends included repeats of weekday shows, as well as "Money Talk" with Bob Brinker and a travel show with Rudy Maxa.  News at the beginning of each hour came from Townhall.com and Salem Radio News (SRN).

On January 3, 2018, Salem agreed to sell WBIX to the International Church of the Grace of God for $685,000; the new owners began programming the station under a local marketing agreement on January 8. At that time, the station changed to a Portuguese language format, branded "Nossa Rádio USA". Nossa Rádio's programming had been heard on WMVX (1570 AM, now WUBG) prior to 2017. The sale was completed on June 20, 2018.

References

External links

Radio stations established in 1922
1922 establishments in Massachusetts
Radio stations licensed before 1923 and still broadcasting
BIX
Brazilian-American culture
BIX
Portuguese-American culture in Massachusetts
Portuguese-language radio stations in the United States
RKO General
Former subsidiaries of The Walt Disney Company